Makhdoom Shahabuddin (Urdu,; born 7 April 1947) is a Pakistani politician and was a member of the National Assembly of Pakistan (February 2008 to May 2013) who has held federal ministerial portfolios for finance, health and textiles. He has been elected as MNA from constituency NA-194 three times in 1990 Pakistani general election, 1993 Pakistani general election and 2008 Pakistani general election.

He is from Mian Wali Qureshian, Rahim Yar Khan, a town in the Saraiki belt of southern Punjab and his political affiliation is with the Pakistan Peoples Party (PPP).

Political career 
Makhdoom Shahabudin has been involved with the Pakistan Peoples Party (PPP) since the Zulfikar Ali Bhutto regime in the 1970s, when his father Makhdoom Hameed-ud-Din was amongst the party's founding members and later served as federal minister under Bhutto. Shahabuddin has been one of the senior-most members in People's Party, having served in its central executive committee and as regional president for the party in South Punjab. He was considered especially close to the party's former leader, Benazir Bhutto. And after her assassination in 2008, he was recommended as the candidate for Prime Minister of Pakistan in the 2008 Pakistan elections. But Yousaf Raza Gillani was preferred by Mrs Bhutto's widower and eventual President Asif Ali Zardari.

On 19 June 2012, in the aftermath of Yousaf Raza Gilani's conviction and disqualification by the Pakistan Supreme Court on contempt of court charges, Shahabuddin was appointed by the PPP as its candidate for the office of Prime Minister of Pakistan but the nomination was cancelled after a warrant for his arrest was issued by the ANF under suspicious circumstances upon the very day he was nominated.

He served as Federal Minister of Pakistan of Textiles under the Gilani government.

He is the descendant and successor (sajjada-nasheen) of a famous Sufi saint, Sheikh Makhdoom Hameed-ud-Din Shah Hakim Al-Qureshi Al-Hashmi Suhrawardi and his mausoloem in Mao Mubarak, Rahimyar Khan. He is also closely related to Federal Minister Khusro Bakhtiar with whom he has contested elections with, for the National Assembly seat of NA-177 (RahimYarKhan-III).

Sexual harassment allegations
On 5 June 2020, American journalist Cynthia Ritchie accused former federal minister Shahabuddin along with former prime minister Yousuf Raza Gillani of having sexually harassed her at President House Islamabad in 2011.

Legal trouble
On the day of his nomination as PM the Anti-Narcotics Force issued a non-bailable warrant for his arrest. The Supreme Court of Pakistan in its decision to grant him bail observed that it was not merely a coincidence that the warrants for his arrest were issued upon the very day that he was nominated by the PPP.

References

External links

 Profile at National Assembly
 Profile: Shahabuddin's journey
 

1947 births
Living people
Forman Christian College alumni
Pakistan People's Party MNAs
People from Rahim Yar Khan District
Pakistani MNAs 1990–1993
Pakistani MNAs 1993–1996
Pakistani MNAs 2008–2013
Defence Production Ministers of Pakistan